The 69th Annual Tony Awards were held on June 7, 2015, to recognize achievement in Broadway productions during the 2014–15 season. The ceremony was held at Radio City Music Hall in New York City and broadcast live by CBS. Kristin Chenoweth and Alan Cumming hosted the ceremony.

Of the ceremony's most winning productions, The Curious Incident of the Dog in the Night-Time and Fun Home each won five Tony Awards in the play and musical categories, respectively. Both An American in Paris and the Lincoln Center revival of The King and I took home four Tony Awards.

Eligibility
Shows that opened on Broadway during the 2014–15 season before April 23, 2015 were eligible for consideration.

Original plays
Airline Highway
The Audience
Constellations
The Country House
The Curious Incident of the Dog in the Night-Time
Disgraced
Fish in the Dark
Hand to God
Living on Love
The River
Wolf Hall Parts One & Two

Original musicals
An American in Paris
Doctor Zhivago
Finding Neverland
Fun Home
Holler If Ya Hear Me
Honeymoon in Vegas
It Shoulda Been You
The Last Ship
Something Rotten!
The Visit

Play revivals
A Delicate Balance
The Elephant Man
The Heidi Chronicles
It's Only a Play
Love Letters
The Real Thing
Skylight
This Is Our Youth
You Can't Take It with You

Musical revivals
Gigi
The King and I
On the Town
On the Twentieth Century
Side Show

Awards events

Nominations
The Tony Award nominations were announced on April 28, 2015 by Mary-Louise Parker and Bruce Willis. The musicals An American in Paris and Fun Home had the most nominations with 12, followed by Something Rotten! with 10, the revival of The King and I with 9 and Wolf Hall Parts One & Two with 8.

Other events
This is the first year that a new Tony Award was given for Excellence in Theatre Education (presented by Carnegie Mellon University). The award was presented to an educator who demonstrates "a positive impact on the lives of students, advancing the theatre profession and a commitment to excellence."

This year, the number of nominees in several categories may be increased, depending upon the number of eligible candidates. This change affects performance categories, Best Direction of both plays and musicals, and Best Choreography.

Ceremony
The Creative Arts Awards portion of the awards ceremony was hosted by Jessie Mueller and James Monroe Iglehart. The Creative Arts Awards usually include Best Lighting Design of a Play, Best Lighting Design of a Musical, Best Costume Design of a Play, Best Costume Design of a Musical, Best Orchestrations.

There were  performances at the awards ceremony from musicals which have been nominated for a Tony Award, and those which have not been nominated, including: An American in Paris, The King and I, On the Town, On the Twentieth Century, The Visit, Fun Home, Something Rotten!, It Shoulda Been You, Finding Neverland and Gigi.

Presenters
The presenters included:

 Jason Alexander
 Rose Byrne
 Bobby Cannavale
 Anna Chlumsky
 Bradley Cooper
 Harry Connick, Jr.
 Misty Copeland
 Bryan Cranston
 Larry David
 Taye Diggs
 Sutton Foster
 Jennifer Grey
 Joel Grey
 Neil Patrick Harris
 Marg Helgenberger
 Dulé Hill
 Nick Jonas
 Kiesza
 Judith Light
 Jennifer Lopez
 Patina Miller
 Joe Manganiello
 Debra Messing
 Jennifer Nettles
 Jim Parsons
 Bernadette Peters
 David Hyde Pierce
 Phylicia Rashad
 Thomas Sadoski
 Taylor Schilling
 Amanda Seyfried
 Sting
 Corey Stoll
 Kiefer Sutherland
 Ashley Tisdale
 Tommy Tune
 Rita Wilson

Non-competitive awards
Tommy Tune received the Lifetime Achievement Award. The Tony Honors for Excellence in Theatre award recipients are: Adrian Bryan-Brown (press agent), Gene O'Donovan (Hudson Scenic Studio founder), and Arnold Abramson (scenery designer and painter). The Cleveland Play House received the Regional Theatre Tony Award. John Cameron Mitchell received the Special Tony Award for his return to Hedwig and the Angry Inch. Stephen Schwartz was given the Isabelle Stevenson Award. The new education award was presented to Corey Mitchell, Performing Arts Teacher and Theatre Director, Northwest School of the Arts, Charlotte, North Carolina.

Winners and nominees

{| class="wikitable" style="width:95%;"
|-
! ! style="background:silver; width:50%;"| Best Play
! ! style="background:silver; width:50%;"| Best Musical
|-
| valign="top" |
 The Curious Incident of the Dog in the Night-Time – Simon Stephens
 Disgraced – Ayad Akhtar
 Hand to God – Robert Askins
 Wolf Hall Parts One & Two – Mike Poulton
| valign="top" |
 Fun Home
 An American in Paris
 Something Rotten!
 The Visit
|-
! ! style="background:silver; width=;"50%"| Best Revival of a Play
! ! style="background:silver; width=;"50%"| Best Revival of a Musical
|-
| valign="top" |
 Skylight
 The Elephant Man
 This Is Our Youth
 You Can't Take It with You
| valign="top" |
 The King and I
 On the Town
 On the Twentieth Century
|-
! ! style="background:silver; width=;"50%"| Best Performance by a Leading Actor in a Play
! ! style="background:silver; width=;"50%"| Best Performance by a Leading Actress in a Play
|-
| valign="top" |
 Alex Sharp – The Curious Incident of the Dog in the Night-Time as Christopher Boone
 Steven Boyer – Hand to God as Jason/Tyrone
 Bradley Cooper – The Elephant Man as John Merrick
 Ben Miles – Wolf Hall Parts One & Two as Thomas Cromwell
 Bill Nighy – Skylight as Tom Sergeant
| valign="top" |
 Helen Mirren – The Audience as Queen Elizabeth II
 Geneva Carr – Hand to God as Margery
 Elisabeth Moss – The Heidi Chronicles as Heidi Holland
 Carey Mulligan – Skylight as Kyra Hollis
 Ruth Wilson – Constellations as Marianne
|-
! ! style="background:silver; width=;"50%"| Best Performance by a Leading Actor in a Musical
! ! style="background:silver; width=;"50%"| Best Performance by a Leading Actress in a Musical
|-
| valign="top" |
 Michael Cerveris – Fun Home as Bruce Bechdel
 Robert Fairchild – An American in Paris as Jerry Mulligan
 Brian d'Arcy James – Something Rotten! as Nick Bottom
 Ken Watanabe – The King and I as The King of Siam
 Tony Yazbeck – On the Town as Gabey
| valign="top" | Kelli O'Hara – The King and I as Anna Leonowens Kristin Chenoweth – On the Twentieth Century as Lily Garland
 Leanne Cope – An American in Paris as Lise Dassin
 Beth Malone – Fun Home as Alison Bechdel
 Chita Rivera – The Visit as Claire Zachannassian
|-
! ! style="background:silver; width=;"50%"| Best Performance by a Featured Actor in a Play
! ! style="background:silver; width=;"50%"| Best Performance by a Featured Actress in a Play
|-
| valign="top" |
 Richard McCabe – The Audience as PM Harold Wilson Matthew Beard – Skylight as Edward Sergeant
 K. Todd Freeman – Airline Highway as Sissy Na Na
 Alessandro Nivola – The Elephant Man as Frederick Treves
 Nathaniel Parker – Wolf Hall Parts One & Two as Henry VIII
 Micah Stock – It's Only a Play as Gus P. Head
| valign="top" |
 Annaleigh Ashford – You Can't Take It With You as Essie Carmichael Patricia Clarkson – The Elephant Man as Madge Kendal
 Lydia Leonard – Wolf Hall Parts One & Two as Anne Boleyn
 Sarah Stiles – Hand to God as Jessica
 Julie White – Airline Highway as Tanya
|-
! ! style="background:silver; width=;"50%"| Best Performance by a Featured Actor in a Musical
! ! style="background:silver; width=;"50%"| Best Performance by a Featured Actress in a Musical
|-
| valign="top" |
 Christian Borle – Something Rotten! as The Bard Andy Karl – On the Twentieth Century as Bruce Granit
 Brad Oscar – Something Rotten! as Nostradamus
 Brandon Uranowitz – An American in Paris as Adam Hochberg
 Max von Essen – An American in Paris as Henri Baurel
| valign="top" |
 Ruthie Ann Miles – The King and I as Lady Thiang Victoria Clark – Gigi as Mamita
 Judy Kuhn – Fun Home as Helen Bechdel
 Sydney Lucas – Fun Home as Small Alison
 Emily Skeggs – Fun Home as Medium Alison
|-
! ! style="background:silver; width=;"50%"| Best Book of a Musical
! ! style="background:silver; width=;"50%"| Best Original Score (Music and/or Lyrics) Written for the Theatre
|-
| valign="top" |
 Fun Home – Lisa Kron An American in Paris – Craig Lucas
 Something Rotten! – Karey Kirkpatrick and John O'Farrell
 The Visit – Terrence McNally
| valign="top" |
 Fun Home – Jeanine Tesori (music) and Lisa Kron (lyrics) The Last Ship – Sting (music and lyrics)
 Something Rotten! – Wayne Kirkpatrick (music and lyrics) and Karey Kirkpatrick (music and lyrics)
 The Visit – John Kander (music) and Fred Ebb (lyrics)
This was the first time an all-female team won in this category.
|-
! ! style="background:silver; width=;"50%"| Best Scenic Design of a Play
! ! style="background:silver; width=;"50%"| Best Scenic Design of a Musical
|-
| valign="top" |
 Bunny Christie and Finn Ross – The Curious Incident of the Dog in the Night-Time Bob Crowley – Skylight
 Christopher Oram – Wolf Hall Parts One & Two
 David Rockwell – You Can't Take It with You
| valign="top" |
 Bob Crowley and 59 Productions – An American in Paris David Rockwell – On the Twentieth Century
 Michael Yeargan – The King and I
 David Zinn – Fun Home
|-
! ! style="background:silver; width=;"50%"| Best Costume Design of a Play
! ! style="background:silver; width=;"50%"| Best Costume Design of a Musical
|-
| valign="top" |
 Christopher Oram – Wolf Hall Parts One & Two Bob Crowley – The Audience
 Jane Greenwood – You Can't Take It with You
 David Zinn – Airline Highway
| valign="top" |
 Catherine Zuber – The King and I Gregg Barnes – Something Rotten!
 Bob Crowley – An American in Paris
 William Ivey Long – On the Twentieth Century
|-
! ! style="background:silver; width=;"50%"| Best Lighting Design of a Play
! ! style="background:silver; width=;"50%"| Best Lighting Design of a Musical
|-
| valign="top" |
 Paule Constable – The Curious Incident of the Dog in the Night-Time Paule Constable and David Plater – Wolf Hall Parts One & Two
 Natasha Katz – Skylight
 Japhy Weideman – Airline Highway
| valign="top"|
 Natasha Katz – An American in Paris Donald Holder – The King and I
 Ben Stanton – Fun Home
 Japhy Weideman – The Visit
|-
! ! style="background:silver; width=;"50%"| Best Direction of a Play
! ! style="background:silver; width=;"50%"| Best Direction of a Musical
|-
| valign="top" |
 Marianne Elliott – The Curious Incident of the Dog in the Night-Time Stephen Daldry – Skylight
 Scott Ellis – You Can't Take It With You
 Jeremy Herrin – Wolf Hall Parts One & Two
 Moritz von Stuelpnagel – Hand to God
| valign="top" |
 Sam Gold – Fun Home Casey Nicholaw – Something Rotten!
 John Rando – On the Town
 Bartlett Sher – The King and I
 Christopher Wheeldon – An American in Paris
|-
! ! style="background:silver; width=;"50%"| Best Choreography
! ! style="background:silver; width=;"50%"| Best Orchestrations
|-
| valign="top" |
 Christopher Wheeldon – An American in Paris Joshua Bergasse – On the Town
 Christopher Gattelli – The King and I
 Scott Graham and Steven Hoggett – The Curious Incident of the Dog in the Night-Time
 Casey Nicholaw – Something Rotten!
| valign="top" |
 Christopher Austin, Don Sebesky and Bill Elliot – An American in Paris' John Clancy – Fun Home Larry Hochman – Something Rotten! Rob Mathes – The Last Ship|}

Awards and nominations per production

Individuals with multiple nominations
 4: Bob Crowley
 2: Paule Constable, Natasha Katz, Lisa Kron, Japhy Weideman

In Memoriam
During the tribute Josh Groban sang the song "You'll Never Walk Alone" from the musical Carousel''.

Jayne Meadows Allen
Lauren Bacall
Polly Bergen
Bunny Briggs
Stanley Chase
B.J. Crosby
Ruby Dee
Eugene Louis 'Luigi' Faccuito
James Garner
Gerry Goffin
Carole L. Haber
Joseph P. Harris
Edward Herrmann
Geoffrey Holder
Louis Jourdan
Charles Keating
Robert H. Livingston
Brian Macdonald
Geraldine McEwan
Anne Meara
Barry Moss
Rosemary Murphy
Peter Neufeld
Mike Nichols
Leonard Nimoy
Joan Rivers
Mary Rodgers
Julius Rudel
Donald Saddler
Herb Schapiro
Gene Saks
Richard Seader
Donald Sinden
Elaine Stritch
Marian Seldes
Andrea "Spook" Testani
Jay Thompson
Voytek
Eli Wallach
Robin Williams
Elizabeth Wilson
Julie Wilson

See also
 Drama Desk Awards
 2015 Laurence Olivier Awards – equivalent awards for West End theatre productions
 Obie Award
 New York Drama Critics' Circle
 Theatre World Award
 Lucille Lortel Awards

References

External links
 Tony Awards Official Site

Tony Awards ceremonies
2015 theatre awards
2015 awards in the United States
2015 in New York City
2010s in Manhattan
Television shows directed by Glenn Weiss